Below is a Lists of Maccabiah Games medalists which includes all Maccabiah medalists since 1932, organized by each sport or discipline.

Maccabiah sports

See also
 List of sport awards

 
Medalists